Poor as a Church Mouse is a 1931 German musical comedy film directed by Richard Oswald and starring Grete Mosheim, Anton Edthofer and Hans Thimig. It was based on the 1928 play A templom egere by Ladislas Fodor, which has been turned into several films including the 1934 British comedy The Church Mouse. The film's art direction was overseen by Franz Schroedter. It premiered at the Gloria-Palast in Berlin.

Cast
 Grete Mosheim as Susi Sachs
 Anton Edthofer as Baron Thomas von Ullrich
 Hans Thimig as Frany, der Barons Sohn
 Paul Hörbiger as Count Friedrich Thalheim
 Fritz Grünbaum as Schünzl
 Paul Morgan as Quapil
 Charlotte Ander as Olly Frey, Sekretärin
 Trude Hesterberg
 Senta Söneland
 Rina Marsa
 Ernst Wurmser
 Arthur Mainzer
 Monsieur Thonny
 Gerd Oswald

References

Bibliography

External links

1931 films
1931 musical comedy films
German musical comedy films
1930s German-language films
Films directed by Richard Oswald
Films of the Weimar Republic
Films set in Vienna
German films based on plays
Films about businesspeople
German black-and-white films
Films scored by Ralph Benatzky
1930s German films